Posht-e Par-e Soleyman (also Romanized as Posht-e Par-e Soleymān; also known as Soleymānī) is a village in Jereh Rural District, Jereh and Baladeh District, Kazerun County, Fars Province, Iran. At the 2006 census, its population was 263, in 58 families.

References 

Populated places in Kazerun County